Tuka is a surname. Notable people with the surname include:

Amel Tuka (born 1991), Bosnian middle-distance runner
George Tuka (born 1963), Ukrainian politician and activist
Mirsad Tuka (born 1965), Bosnian actor
Vojtech Tuka (1880–1946), Slovak politician

See also